Kiaseh (also Romanized as Kīāseh; also known as Kīāsar) is a village in Shuil Rural District, Rahimabad District, Rudsar County, Gilan Province, Iran. At the 1987 census, its population was 200, in 70 families and they have seen much of the kingdom in their history.

References 

Populated places in Rudsar County